Bronwyn Ngaire Mackintosh (born 24 June 1970) is a former Australian rugby union player. She made her test debut for Australia against the United States in 1997 in Brisbane. She represented Australia at the 1998 Rugby World Cup in the Netherlands.

Mackintosh was also part of the Wallaroos 2002 Rugby World Cup squad. She scored their first try at halftime in the 30–0 win over Wales during the pool stages. She was named in the starting line-up that faced the Black Ferns in their final pool game.

In 2007, Mackintosh competed at the Dubai International Sevens for the Wooden Spoon women's team. The team was made up of players from England, Scotland, Wales and Australia; they eventually won the tournament undefeated.

Mackintosh is a Station Officer at Fire and Rescue New South Wales. During the Queen’s Birthday Honours in 2019, she was awarded the Australian Fire Service Medal (AFSM), the highest honour that an Australian firefighter can receive. She has a Bachelor in Sport Science from the University of Technology and studied for an MBA at Newcastle University.

References 

1970 births
Living people
Australian female rugby union players
Australia women's international rugby union players